Abl interactor 2 also known as Abelson interactor 2 (Abi-2) is a protein that in humans is encoded by the ABI2 gene.

Interactions
ABI2 has been shown to interact with  ABL1, ADAM19, and TRIM32.

References

Further reading

External links